The 2010 Shakey's V-League (SVL) season was the seventh season of the Shakey's V-League. There were two indoor conferences for this season.

1st Conference 

The Shakey's V-League 7th Season 1st Conference was the eleventh conference of Shakey's V-League, a collegiate women's volleyball league in the Philippines founded in 2004. The conference started April 11, 2010.

 Participating teams

 Pool A

 Pool B

Preliminary round 
 Pool A

 Pool B

Quarterfinals 
 Pool C

 Pool D

Final round 
 All series are best-of-3

 Final standings

 Individual awards

2nd Conference 

The Shakey's V-League 7th Season Open Conference was the twelfth conference of Shakey's V-League, commenced on July 10, 2010 at The Arena in San Juan.

Participating teams

Preliminary round 

 SW = sets won; SL = sets lost

Quarterfinals

Final round 
 All series are best-of-3

 Final standings

 Individual awards

References 

2010 in Philippine sport